Heinrich Lilienfein (20 November 1879 - 20 December 1954) was a German writer.

Literary works 
 Der Stier von Olivera, 1910
 Das fressend Feuer, 1932
 Die Stunde Karls XII, 1938
 Besuch aus Holland, 1943
 Licht und Irrlicht, 1943
 Anna Amalia, 1949
 Bettina, 1949

1879 births
1954 deaths
German male writers